= Seoga & Cook =

South Korean restaurant chain

- Industry: Restaurants
- Founded: South Korea (2006)
- Headquarters: Seoul, South Korea
- Number of locations: 77 stores (2015)
- Website: Official website

Seoga & Cook (Korean: 서가앤쿡) is a restaurant chain based in South Korea owned by the S&S Company. As of 2014, the chain had over 77 retail stores in South Korea.
